Linospadix is a genus of flowering plant in the family Arecaceae. It is native to New Guinea and Australia.

It contains the following species:

Linospadix albertisianus (Becc.) Burret - New Guinea
Linospadix apetiolatus Dowe & A.K.Irvine - Queensland
Linospadix caninus (Becc.) Burret - Western New Guinea
Linospadix microcaryus (Domin) Burret - Queensland
Linospadix minor  (W.Hill) Burret - Minor walking stick palm - Queensland
Linospadix monostachyos  (Mart.) H.Wendl. - Walking stick palm - Queensland, New South Wales
Linospadix palmerianus (F.M.Bailey) Burret - Queensland

formerly included

Linospadix leptostachys Burret = Calyptrocalyx sessiliflorus Dowe & M.D.Ferrero - Papua New Guinea

References

 
Arecaceae genera
Taxonomy articles created by Polbot